Roger Alexander Falconer FREng, ForMemCAE, FLSW, FEurASc, is Emeritus Professor of Water and Environmental Engineering at Cardiff University, Independent Water Engineering and Environmental Management Consultant, Tidal Energy Consultant, and Chair Professor at Hohai University and the Yangtze Institute for Conservation and Development, China.

Education 
Born in Carmarthen (12 December 1951), Falconer attended grammar schools in Llandeilo (1962–65) and Bridgend (1965-70) and then graduated with a BSc(Eng) degree in Civil Engineering, from King's College London, in 1973. He then studied at the University of Washington, where he graduated with an MSCE degree in 1974. He returned to the UK, where he carried out research in computational hydraulics at Imperial College London, where he was awarded a PhD degree in 1977. He was subsequently awarded DEng and DSc(Eng) degrees from the University of Birmingham (1992) and University of London (1994) respectively.

Career and research 
Falconer is currently Emeritus Professor of Water and Environmental Engineering (since 2018), at Cardiff University, and Chair Professor (since 2019) at Hohai University and the Yangtze Institute for Conservation and Development, in Nanjing, China. He was previously: Professor of Water Management and Founding Director of the Hydro-environmental Research Centre, at Cardiff University (1997-2018); Professor of Water Engineering (1987–97) and Head of the Department of Civil Engineering (1993–97) at the University of Bradford; and Lecturer in Civil Engineering (1977–86) at the University of Birmingham. He was President of the International Association for Hydro-Environment Engineering and Research (IAHR) from 2011-15. Falconer’s research has primarily focused on modelling hydrodynamic, water quality and sediment transport processes in river, estuarine and coastal waters and his computational models have been used in over 100 hydro-environmental impact assessment studies world-wide. His DIVAST model for predicting peak water levels and inundation extent in floods provides one of the engines for the widely used commercial 2-D model Flood Modeller, now being further developed and applied by Jacobs Engineering Group. Falconer has given over 40 keynote presentations at international conferences and over 560 talks to public meetings and universities in 30 countries. He also regularly participates in TV and press interviews on topics such as: global water security, water quality, flood risk and tidal energy. Falconer has been a member of a number of high profile committees in the UK and internationally, such as: Co-Chair of the International Group of Experts in the International Tribunal for the Law of the Sea Case concerning Land Reclamation by Singapore in and around the Straits of Johor (Malaysia v. Singapore, 2003), Member of the Trustee Board of the Chartered Institution of Water and Environmental Management  (2016-20), Member and Coastal Lead of the Yorkshire Region Flood and Coastal Committee (2019-date), Member of the Welsh Government Hinkley Point C Stakeholder Reference Group (2020–date), and Member of the Independent Expert Group for the London Flood Review (2021-22).

Awards and honours 
Falconer’s work has been recognised through various awards, most notably: Award of Honorary Doctor of Engineering by the University of Bradford (2022), the International Association for Hydraulic Research Ippen Award (1992), the Royal Academy of Engineering Silver Medal (1999), the Institution of Civil Engineers Telford Premium (1993), the Institution of Civil Engineers Robert Alfred Carr Prize (2003) and (2007), and Honorary Member of the International Association for Hydro-Environment Engineering and Research (2017).

Falconer is a Fellow of the Royal Academy of Engineering (1997), Foreign Member of the Chinese Academy of Engineering (2019), Fellow of the Learned Society of Wales (2011), Fellow of the European Academy of Sciences (2018), and a Fellow of the City and Guilds of London Institute (1997). He is a Chartered Engineer, Chartered Environmentalist and Chartered Water and Environmental Manager, and a Fellow of the: Institution of Civil Engineers, Chartered Institution of Water and Environmental Management, and American Society of Civil Engineers.

References 

1945 births
Living people
Welsh civil engineers
Alumni of King's College London
University of Washington alumni
Alumni of Imperial College London
Academics of Cardiff University
Fellows of the Royal Academy of Engineering
Fellows of the Learned Society of Wales